East Parish Burying Ground, also known as Centre Street Burying Ground or Centre Street Cemetery, is an historic cemetery located at Centre and Cotton streets in the village of Newton Corner in the city of Newton, Massachusetts. On December 23, 1983, it was listed on the National Register of Historic Places. It has been called the "most important, the most evocative and also the most fragile historic site in the city."

History
East Parish Cemetery dates from the 1660s when the term parish had both a political and religious connotation. The East Parish Church was First Church in Newton organized in 1664, which celebrated its 300th anniversary in 1964, but was dissolved in 1973 after failed attempts to merge with its two daughter churches, Second Church in Newton (West Parish) and Eliot Church. First Church's last church building at 1115 Centre Street in Newton Centre is now the Greek Evangelical Church of Boston.

First Settlers Monument
The First Settlers Monument was erected September 1, 1852, to commemorate the first settlers of East Parish and has inscriptions on its four sides as follows:
The north side inscription recounts that the first acre was given by Deacon John Jackson for the burial place and First Church, while his son Abraham Jackson gave the  that form the old part of the cemetery. Edward Jackson gave  in 1660 and another  in 1681.
The west side inscription lists 20 early settlers with the year each settled in Newton as well as the year of death. The earliest year of settlement is 1640 and the latest is 1664.
The south side inscription commemorates Thomas Wiswall, who was ordained ruling elder on July 20, 1664, and his four sons.
The east side inscription commemorates the Reverend John Eliot, Jr., first pastor of First Church in Newton, who was ordained July 20, 1664. It states also that his widow remarried, that his only daughter married, and that his only son went to Windsor, Connecticut and died leaving a son.

Location
East Parish burying ground is bordered on the north and east by lands of the Centre Street congregation of the Missionary Franciscan Sisters of the Immaculate Conception. Across Centre Street is the campus of the former Newton College of the Sacred Heart, which is now owned by Boston College, which uses the campus for its Law School as well as to house freshmen. Cotton Street is the approximate boundary between Newton Corner to the north and Newton Centre to the south.

Current Status
Historic Newton manages the preservation of the graves and tombs of Newton's City-owned historic burying grounds.

See also
 National Register of Historic Places listings in Newton, Massachusetts
 Thomas Wiswall
 West Parish Burying Ground
 Jackson Homestead
 Capt. Edward Durant House

References

External links

List of those buried in East Parish Burying Ground
Inscriptions on First Settlers monument and on 5 memorial tablets
Historic Newton Homepage

National Register of Historic Places in Newton, Massachusetts
Cemeteries on the National Register of Historic Places in Massachusetts
Cemeteries in Newton, Massachusetts